is a Japanese manga artist. He is best known for his adaptations of Kenji Miyazawa's children novels, including his work on the anime film Night on the Galactic Railroad (1985), and for several manga series set in the fantasy universe Atagoul. Several of his manga feature anthropomorphic cats as protagonists.

Career 
Masumura started his career in 1973 at the age of 21, when he was the runner-up in the 5th Tezuka Award and subsequently got to publish his debut work Kiri ni musebu yoru in Weekly Shōnen Jump, still using the kanji version of his name (増村博) rather than the hiragana one he would subsequently use. In 1975, he published a few short stories in the alternative manga magazine Garo, which were his first stories set in the Atagoul universe. The series Atagoul Monogatari started 1976 in the manga magazine Manga Shōnen and became the first of several spin-off series that he drew for different magazines until 2011. Over 6 million copies of books within the Atagoul universe were sold as of 2007.

Starting from 1983, Masumura has adapted several stories by Kenji Miyazawa into manga. In 1983 alone, he released adaptations of Night on the Galactic Railroad, Gauche the Cellist, Kaze no Matasaburo and The Life of Budori Gusuko. Night on the Galactic Railroad was adapted into a successful anime film in 1985 under the direction of Gisaburō Sugii.

Themes and influences 
Many of Masumura's manga feature anthropomorphic cats and humans living together in the utopian fantasy land "Atagoul" on the continent "Yonezaad", which spans fantastic landscapes made up of minerals and megasized plants. The most famous character is the humorous cat Hideyoshi, the protagonist of Atagoul. The idea of cats and humans living at equal terms derives from Miyazawa's short story The Acorns and Wildcat. Masumura explained in an interview why he often chooses cats as characters over humans: "The second you set down a human face to this story, it changes the feeling of the story entirely, defining it around your own image, and I wanted to avoid that."

The world-building of Atagoul is influenced by Kenji Miyazawa's fantasy world of Itahov, which he could relate to on an emotional level. Like Miyazawa, Masumura uses neologisms in order to create a feeling of mystery. Masanao Amano describes Masumura's worldbuilding like this: "When reading the manga we become aware of sounds that are usually forgotten, such as little sounds in the dead of the night, sounds of nature, or the sound of the wind."

Legacy and Awards 

His work has been exhibited several times in art museums in Japan, among them solo exhibitions at Hachiōji Yume Art Museum in Tokyo in 2007, Sumida Hokusai Museum in 2018, Yamagata Museum of Art in his home province in 2022 and Hachioji Yume Art Museum in 2023. A public transport bus in his hometown of Yonezawa features characters from Atagoul. 

After the popularity of the 1985 adaptation of Night on the Galactic Railroad, other anime films based on Miyazawa's work also used character design inspired by Masumura, like Spring and Chaos (1996, directed by Shōji Kawamori) and The Life of Budori Gusuko (2012, also directed by Gisaburō Sugii). Atagoul was adapted into an CG-animated short released in 2004. 

His manga have not been translated into English. However, the first four volumes of Atagoul wa Neko no Mori have been translated into French in 2015.

Besides the Tezuka Award in 1973, Masumura received the following awards:

 Japan Cartoonists Association Award 1997: Grand Prize for Atagoul Tamatebako
 Itahov Prize 2001

Works

Serializations

One-shots

References 

Manga artists
Japanese fantasy writers
1952 births
Living people